Ahmed Dowidar is an Egyptian footballer. He currently plays as a defender for El Entag El Harby in the Egyptian Premier League.

Dowidar is also a member of the Egypt national football team, having appeared 9 times, making his debut in an official friendly match against Australia in 2010.

Career
Although Dowidar plays as a defender, he has a good goal scoring record. This is mainly because he is a master penalty taker. He scored a total of 4 goals in the 2008–09 Egyptian Premier League and another 6 in the 2009–10 season.

He played as a defender for Kazma Sporting Club in the Kuwaiti Premier League in 2013.

Several Egyptian teams, including both Egyptian giants Al Ahly and Zamalek, revealed their interest in Dowidar. However, Ittihad El-Shorta issued a hands-off warning over these interests.

On Sunday June 15, 2014 Dowidar signed a three years contract with Zamalek.

On 25 January 2017, Dowidar announce the completion of his move to Alexandrian side Smouha SC

Honours

Club
Zamalek SC
Egyptian Premier League: 2014–15
Egypt Cup (2): 2015, 2016

References

External links
 

1987 births
Living people
Egyptian footballers
Egypt international footballers
Egyptian expatriate footballers
Ittihad El Shorta SC players
Kazma SC players
Zamalek SC players
Expatriate footballers in Kuwait
Egyptian expatriate sportspeople in Kuwait
2017 Africa Cup of Nations players
Egyptian Premier League players
Association football defenders
El Entag El Harby SC players
Kuwait Premier League players
Ismaily SC players